

Murals
 Broadway Street: 1910–1920 (2011), Bev Ecker
 Forest for the Trees murals (2017); three murals by Meg Adamson and Jennifer Parks, Blaine Fontana, and Drew Merritt
 Hernandez Mural (2009), Hector Hernandez and Merlo Station Students
 Larry Kangas Mural (29014), Larry Kangas (completed by Sandy Kangas and Allison McClay)
 Rather Severe Mural (2016), Rather Severe
 The School of Outdoor Learning (2011), Angelina Marino
 Steps to Wellness (2012), Angelina Marino
 Wilson Mural (2009), Gina Wilson

Source: City of Beaverton, Oregon

Sculpture
 embrace your inner light (2016), Angela Ridgway
 Just the Two of Us, Katy McFadden
 Ribbon Candy (2014), Paul Vexler
 Singing Sky (2010), Richard Taylor
 Spinning Progress (2017), Reven Swanson
 Sun (2016), Jesse Swickard
 Three Creeks, One Will (2013), Devin Laurence Field

Source: City of Beaverton, Oregon

References

External links

 Downtown Beaverton Public Art Tour Map (PDF), City of Beaverton, Oregon

Culture of Beaverton, Oregon
Beaverton, Oregon
Beaverton
Outdoor sculptures in Beaverton, Oregon